Hannover Airport  is the international airport of Hanover, capital of the German state of Lower Saxony. The airport has flights to European metropolitan and leisure destinations, and serves as a base for Eurowings, Corendon Airlines Europe and TUI fly Deutschland.

History

Early years

Hannover Airport was opened in Langenhagen in 1952, replacing an old airfield within the city limits of Hanover. In 1973 two modern terminals were opened, which became famous because of their compact design. They became the archetype for the Sheremetyevo International Airport in Moscow. These terminals A and B are still in service today.

In the 1990s, trials of intercontinental services to the United States and Canada were stopped due to low passenger numbers.

In 1998, the largest terminal, C, was opened to handle more passengers, adding 8 more boarding gates and 3 bus departure gates. Up to 33 aircraft can be handled simultaneously, of which 20 can use aircraft stands equipped with a Jetway. All three terminals are capable of handling a Boeing 747.

From 1957 to 1990, the airport hosted the Internationale Luft- und Raumfahrtausstellung, Germany's largest air show. After a fatal accident in 1988, when a Royal Air Force Chinook helicopter hit a Jetway with its rotor, and German Reunification two years later, the air show moved to Berlin in 1992.

Development since the 2000s
In 2000, an S-Bahn connection was established between the airport and Hamelin via Hanover Main Station. This replaced the airport's shuttle bus service which ran every 20 minutes, more frequently than the S-Bahn, but took longer to reach the airport and railway station. The train service was extended to Paderborn in 2003.

TUIfly, which maintains a base at Hannover Airport, dramatically reduced services in 2008 and 2009, and passed all its non-traditional holiday routes to Air Berlin late in 2009. In 2010 Germanwings, a subsidiary of Lufthansa, opened their sixth base at Hanover. In 2017, now defunct airline Air Berlin fully reduced the flight program and operated its last flight from Hannover in March 2017.

Hannover Airport has struggled to generate increased demand in recent years, possibly due to a reluctance or inability to attract Europe's low-cost carriers to serve the airport. New routes from network carriers to their hubs were opened and closed after one season/year due to low demand (e.g., Aer Lingus, Air Baltic, TAP Air Portugal). Although traffic grew satisfactorily during the late 1990s, during the last decade there has been little growth. In both 2007 and 2008, traffic was down less than 1%, but in 2009 it fell by almost 12%. Hannover Airport is one of very few German airports which are open 24 hours a day, but there are very few flights between 23:00 and 04:00.

According to local press plans to restart scheduled long haul operation with a connection to Iran are currently under investigation.

The General Aviation Terminal, located near the center runway, was renamed Karl Jatho Terminal in honour of Hanoverian aviation pioneer Karl Jatho.

Terminal
Hannover Airport has three passenger terminal concourses named Terminals A, B, and C. The landside areas with shops, restaurants, and travel agents are interconnected, but each has its separate airside area with a few more facilities. Terminals A and B each have six boarding gates equipped with jet bridges, while Terminal C has eight of them. Additional bus gates are available in each concourse. Terminal A underwent a major refurbishment as the first concourse from April 2013 and reopened on 9 July 2014.

The additional Terminal D to the east of the main terminal is a rebuilt hangar which is exclusively used by the Royal Air Force to transport British troops to and from Northern Germany.

Airlines and destinations

Passenger
The following airlines offer regular scheduled and charter flights at Hannover Airport.

Cargo

Statistics

Annual traffic

Ground transportation

Train
Hannover Flughafen railway station is located beneath Terminal C and features frequent services of Hanover S-Bahn line S5 to Hanover city centre. The journey time is approximately 17 minutes and the service runs every 30 minutes for 22 hours a day. During important fairs like the Hanover Fair additional hourly services of Hanover S-Bahn line S8 link the airport with the Hanover fairground.

Bus
The 470 bus runs directly from the Langenhagen-Zentrum station to Hannover Airport.

Car
Hannover Airport has its own exit on motorway A352, but can also reached via some local roads. Approximately 14,000 parking spaces are available.

See also
 Transport in Germany
 List of airports in Germany

References

External links

 
 
 

Hannover
Transport in Hanover
Airports established in 1952
Buildings and structures in Lower Saxony